The Talbot-Darracq Grand Prix cars were a series of Grand Prix racing vehicles, designed, and produced by British-French manufacturer Talbot-Darracq, between 1921 and 1932.

References

1926 in motorsport
Talbot vehicles
Grand Prix cars